Retschwil was a municipality in the district of Hochdorf, in the canton of Lucerne, Switzerland.   On 1 January 2009, Retschwil together with Gelfingen, Hämikon, Mosen, Müswangen, and Sulz joined Hitzkirch.

Geography
Of this area, 67.2% is used for agricultural purposes, while 25% is forested. The rest of the land, (7.8%) is settled.

On 21 May 2006 an attempt to merge the Hitzkirch and the surrounding 10 municipalities failed, when five of the eleven voted against the merger.  A less ambitious merger was then proposed and accepted, with the municipalities of Gelfingen, Hämikon, Mosen, Müswangen, Retschwil and Sulz joining Hitzkirch.  The merged municipality has an area of

Demographics
Retschwil has a population of 174, of which 1.7% are foreign nationals.  Over the last 10 years the population has decreased at a rate of -3.9%.  Most of the population speaks German  (96.3%), with Portuguese being second most common ( 2.6%) and French being third ( 0.5%).

In the 2007 election the most popular party was the CVP which received 36.6% of the vote.  The next three most popular parties were the SVP (30.6%), the FDP (22.1%) and the Green Party (6.8%).

The age distribution of the population is children and teenagers (0–19 years old) make up 34% of the population, while adults (20–64 years old) make up 56.5% and seniors (over 64 years old) make up 9.4%.  In Retschwil about 74.2% of the population (between age 25-64) have completed either non-mandatory upper secondary education or additional higher education (either University or a Fachhochschule).

Retschwil has an unemployment rate of 0.58%.  , there were 37 people employed in the primary economic sector and about 12 businesses involved in this sector.  5 people are employed in the secondary sector and there is 1 business in this sector.  16 people are employed in the tertiary sector, with 5 businesses in this sector.

References

Former municipalities of the canton of Lucerne